Owen Sylvester Conway (October 23, 1890 – March 12, 1942) was an American Major League Baseball infielder. He played for the Philadelphia Athletics during the  season.

References

Major League Baseball infielders
Philadelphia Athletics players
Baseball players from New York (state)
1890 births
1942 deaths